Glade Farms is an unincorporated community in Preston County, West Virginia, United States.

The community was so named on account of the marshy glades near the original town site.

References

Unincorporated communities in Preston County, West Virginia
Unincorporated communities in West Virginia